A skill toy of Asian origin, the meteor consists of a rope, usually between 5 and 8 feet (ca. 244 cm) long, with weights attached to either end. Tricks are performed by swinging, wrapping and throwing the meteor about the body.

Origins 

The meteor is based on the Chinese meteor hammer, a bolo-like weapon made from stones and rope. Approximately 1500 years ago, this hunting weapon began its transition into a performing art. The Chinese circus tradition has featured meteors with brightly colored balls, glass bowls filled with colored water, or pans of flaming oil in place of the stone weights.

In Shaolin schools, the water meteor made a useful training aid once a student had gained a certain level of skill. These water meteors consisted of a length of chain with two inward facing bowls for heads. These bowls were then filled with water (or occasionally, sand), in order to train a smooth technique and gain control over the weapon. When the meteor was spinning fast enough, the water would be held in the bowls, with the intention being not to spill any. In China, where this technique was originally developed, once a student had practiced for several years and gained mastery of the meteor, then they could progress to fire meteors. Cirque du Soleil's Varekai features water meteors as an act.

Fire meteor 
The traditional fire meteors were essentially the same as the water meteors, except that instead of containing water, the bowls were instead filled with fuel. This fuel was then lit, and the meteor spun exactly as before, looking like a pair of real harnessed meteors. It is also a dangerous weapon to behold, because one slight mistake could send flaming fuel around in a radius in excess of 20 feet (ca. 6 m).

Modern fire meteors are commonly made similar to the monkey fist meteors, which are made of kevlar, cotton or other natural fiber rope, then connected by chains or rope; also made of kevlar, cotton or natural fiber. The natural fiber, Technora or kevlar rope is necessary as synthetic ropes will melt rapidly, and the natural fiber ropes will also need to be replaced often as well. The Technora or kevlar rope works much better as it is designed to take stress and resist high temperatures.

Freestyle meteor 
Freestyle Meteor refers to the use of the meteor weapon (used in martial arts) in a more visually stunning manner, rather than a combative way. This makes freestyle meteor one of the flow arts.

See also 
Meteor (martial art)
Poi (performance art)

References

External links
 
 
 

Physical activity and dexterity toys
Circus skills
Dance props
Object manipulation
Juggling props